Haliotis roei, common name Roe's abalone, is a species of sea snail, a marine gastropod mollusk in the family Haliotidae, the abalones.

Description
The size of the shell varies between 50 mm and 120 mm.
"The shell has a short-oval shape.  The distance of the apex from the nearest margin is somewhat over one-fifth the greatest length of the shell. The sculpture consists of strong unequal spiral cords crossed by radiating folds. The 7 to 9 perforations are rather small and a little raised The right side is straighter than the rounded left margin, and the back is depressed. The color of the shell is scarlet-red, more or less marbled with olive-green, painted with broad white rays. The spiral riblets are numerous, unequal, separated by deeply cut grooves. Their summits are cut by fine radiating striae. They are further rendered uneven by more or less developed folds radiating from the suture. The spire is rather elevated. The inner surface is silvery, very iridescent, with pink, green and steel-blue reflections. The columellar plate is narrow, obliquely truncated at its base."

Distribution
This marine species is endemic to Australia and occurs off Western Australia to Victoria.

References

 Gray, J.E. 1826. Mollusca. pp. 474–496 in King, P.P. (ed.). Narrative of a Survey of the Intertropical and Western Coasts of Australia. Performed between the years 1818 and 1822; with Appendix B. London : John Murray Vol. 2 viii 637 pp., 9 pls
 Menke, C.T. 1843. Molluscorum Novae Hollandiae Specimen in Libraria Aulica Hahniana. Hannoverae : Libraria Aulica Hahniana pp. 1–46
 Philippi, R.A. 1845. Diagnoses testaceorum quorundam novorum. Zeitschrift für Malakozoologie 3: 147–152 
 Wells, F.E. & Keesing, J.K. 1989. Reproduction and feeding in the abalone Haliotis roei Gray. Australian Journal of Marine and Freshwater Research 40: 187–197 
 Wilson, B. 1993. Australian Marine Shells. Prosobranch Gastropods. Kallaroo, Western Australia : Odyssey Publishing Vol. 1 408 pp
 Shepherd, S.A., McShane, P.E. & Wells, F.E. 1997. Australian abalone. Molluscan Research 18(2): 119–326
 Geiger, D.L. 2000 [1999]. Distribution and biogeography of the recent Haliotidae (Gastropoda: Vetigastropoda) world-wide. Bollettino Malacologico 35(5–12): 57–120 
 Geiger, D.L. & Poppe, G.T. 2000. A Conchological Iconography. The family Haliotidae. Germany : ConchBooks 135 pp
 Degnan, S.D., Imron, Geiger, D.L. & Degnan, B.M. 2006. Evolution in temperate and tropical seas: disparate patterns in southern hemisphere abalone (Mollusca: Vetigastropoda: Haliotidae). Molecular Phylogenetics and Evolution 41: 249–256

External links
 

roei
Gastropods of Australia
Gastropods described in 1826